Haworthia cymbiformis is a species of the genus Haworthia in the family Asphodelaceae, endemic to the Eastern Cape Province in South Africa.

Description

Plants are small and grow clumps of rosettes of thick, fleshy, light green leaves. As one of the soft green group of Haworthias it is frequently confused with its relatives (e.g. Haworthia cooperi which shares a similar distribution range, as well as Haworthia mucronata and Haworthia marumiana to the west).

A distinctive feature is the soft, "boat-shaped" leaves ("cymbiformis" actually means "boat-shaped"). Its leaves are not recurved like the "retuse" Haworthias (e.g. Haworthia mirabilis or Haworthia retusa).

Another feature is that the leaves usually have transparent streaks around their tips. In the wild, the sun is very bright, and the plant grows mostly buried by sand with only these transparent tips above the ground.

Distribution and habitat
The natural range of this species is roughly between Port Elizabeth and East London in Eastern Cape Province, South Africa.

This range closely matches that of its relative, Haworthia cooperi. H.cymboformis grows on cliffs and H.cooperi grows on lowland plains.

This is a summer rainfall region.

Varieties
The variety list below is adapted from WCSP as of February 2018.
 Haworthia cymbiformis var. angustata Poelln.
 Haworthia cymbiformis var. cymbiformis (autonym)
 Haworthia cymbiformis var. incurvula  (Poelln.) M.B.Bayer
 Haworthia cymbiformis var. obtusa  (Haw.) Baker
 Haworthia cymbiformis var. ramosa  (G.G.Sm.) M.B.Bayer 
 Haworthia cymbiformis var. setulifera  (Poelln.) M.B.Bayer

References

External links 
  photos on www.AIAPS.org

cymbiformis
Flora of the Cape Provinces
Endemic flora of South Africa
Garden plants
Plants described in 1804